The James Wright Poetry Festival was held annually in early spring in Martins Ferry, Ohio, United States, Wright's home town, to celebrate the poetry of James Wright, the Pulitzer Prize-winning American poet.  

The festival had been held annually since 1981, but was suspended in 2007.

References

External links
James Wright Poetry Festival homepage

Recurring events established in 1981
2007 disestablishments in Ohio
Poetry festivals in the United States
Festivals in Ohio
Tourist attractions in Belmont County, Ohio
American poetry
1981 establishments in Ohio
Recurring events disestablished in 2007